Back to the Noose is an album by Swashbuckle, released in 2009.

Critical reception
Rock Sound wrote that the album, "though still employing plenty of galloping bass lines and a seafaring lyric or two, is happy to dive into thrashier seas on a few occasions." AllMusic wrote: "Those whose appetite for high-speed, staccato riffing, blastbeats, and growling is nearly insatiable will enjoy this, and there are a few nice guitar solos scattered here and there, but it's not a must-hear by any stretch of the imagination."

Track listing
"Hoist the Mainsail" 1:06
"Scurvy Back" 3:20
"Back to the Noose" 2:32
"Cloudy With a Chance of Piracy" 1:19
"We Sunk Your Battleship" 0:54
"Rounds of Rum" 2:35
"Carnivale Boat Ride" 1:57
"Rime of the Haggard Mariner" 2:00
"Cruise Ship Terror" 2:48
"No Prey No Pay" 2:25
"La Leyenda" 2:05
"Splash-N-Thrash" 2:28
"The Grog Box" 1:29
"The Tradewinds" 2:00
"Attack" 0:43
"Peg-Leg Stomp" 2:37
"Whirlpit" 0:42
"All Seemed Fine Until" 0:55
"It Came From the Deep" 4:39
"Shipwrecked" 2:19
"Sharkbait" 1:03

Personnel
Admiral Nobeard – Vocals, Bass guitar
Commodore Redrum – Guitars, backing vocals
Captain Crashride – Drums

References

2009 albums
Swashbuckle (band) albums